The 1931–32 La Salle Explorers men's basketball team represented La Salle University during the 1931–32 NCAA men's basketball season. The head coach was Thomas Conley, coaching the explorers in his first season. The team finished with an overall record of 15–8.

Schedule

|-

References

La Salle Explorers men's basketball seasons
La Salle
La Salle
La Salle